Events of 2019 in Venezuela.

Incumbents 
 President: Nicolás Maduro, Juan Guaidó (presidential crisis)
 Vice President: Delcy Rodríguez

Governors
Amazonas: Miguel Rodríguez
Anzoátegui: Antonio Barreto Sira
Apure: Ramón Carrizales
Aragua: Rodolfo Clemente Marco Torres
Barinas: Argenis Chávez
Bolívar: Justo Noguera Pietri
Carabobo: Rafael Lacava
Cojedes: Margaud Godoy
Delta Amacuro: Lizeta Hernández
Falcón: Víctor Clark
Guárico: José Manuel Vásquez
Lara: Carmen Meléndez and Adolfo Pereira Antique
Mérida: Ramón Guevara
Miranda: Héctor Rodríguez
Monagas: Yelitza Santaella
Nueva Esparta: Alfredo Díaz
Portuguesa: Rafael Calles
Sucre: Edwin Rojas
Táchira: Laidy Gómez
Trujillo: Henry Rangel Silva
Vargas: Jorge García Carneiro
Yaracuy: Julio León Heredia
Zulia: Omar Prieto

Events 

5 Jan
 The new leadership of the National Assembly is sworn in, with Juan Guaidó as its President.
10 Jan
 After the May 2018 presidential election, Nicolás Maduro is sworn in as Venezuelan President for the second time, to controversy
23 Jan
 The nation protests, with hundreds of thousands taking to the streets across the nation.
 A 4.5 magnitude earthquake hits in Sucre.
Opposition leader Juan Guaidó swears himself in as President of Venezuela, with de facto President Nicolás Maduro not recognizing this.
The United States, Canada and several Latin American nations recognize opposition leader Juan Guaidó as President of Venezuela.
President Nicolás Maduro says Caracas is breaking off diplomatic relations with the United States, giving American diplomats 72 hours to leave the country. Juan Guaidó, in turn, asks diplomats of countries that have recognized him as president to remain in Venezuela.

Births

Deaths

March
March 6 - Alí Domínguez, journalist (b. 1992)

May
May 2 – Juan Vicente Torrealba, Venezuelan harpist and composer (b. 1917)

References

 
2010s in Venezuela
Years of the 21st century in Venezuela
Venezuela
Venezuela